Heather Gooding (born 20 March 1958) is a Barbadian sprinter. She competed in the women's 4 × 400 metres relay at the 1972 Summer Olympics. She was the first woman to represent Barbados at the Olympics.

References

1958 births
Living people
Athletes (track and field) at the 1972 Summer Olympics
Barbadian female sprinters
Barbadian female middle-distance runners
Olympic athletes of Barbados
Place of birth missing (living people)
Olympic female sprinters